"Victoria" is a song by New Zealand rock band The Exponents from their 1982 album Prayers Be Answered and their debut single. Released in June 1982 as the band's debut single, it reached Number 6 on the New Zealand singles chart.  The song was selected by a panel of New Zealand songwriters to have been the #8 top 100 New Zealand songs of all time.

Background
"Victoria" was inspired by Luck's landlady in Christchurch, with the name Victoria used as a pseudonym whilst her real name was Vicky. She successfully ran an escort agency but lived with an abusive man: Luck questioned her relationship with the line "What do you see in him?".

The band moved to Auckland before the release of the song. After the single became a success, Luck visited 'Victoria' in Christchurch and was happy to find that she not only loved the song but had also split from her abusive boyfriend.

Music video
The video was funded by the New Zealand Broadcasting Association but, unusually for the time, included a story rather than just a studio performance. Shot in the band's hometown of Christchurch, it features Jordan Luck as "Victoria's" taxi driver and Al Park, a singer-songwriter sometimes credited as the father figure for the 'Lyttelton Sound' and the first guy to bring punk music to Christchurch. In 2019, Luck would cover Park's "I Walked Away" for the covers collection Better Already - The Songs Of Al Park.

Alternate Versions
The recording of "Victoria" on the Prayers Be Answered album differs from the original single. Another version was also included on the 1985 Amplifier album.

Charts

References

External links
 Victoria Music Video (New Zealand On Screen)
 Victoria - the evolution of a great pop song, Radio New Zealand

1982 singles
APRA Award winners
The Exponents songs
1982 songs